Red Rat Software was a Manchester, UK-based video game developer and publisher founded by Charles Partington, Harry Nadler, and Don Rigby that operated between 1985 and 1993. The company first centered on the Atari 8-bit family home computers, before eventually expanding to other platforms. The company used the slogan "Red Rat has the power!".

Games

1985
A Day at the Races (Atari 8-bit)
Sprong: The Quest for the Golden Pogostick (Atari 8-bit)

1986
Crumble's Crisis (Atari 8-bit)
Escape from Doomworld (Atari 8-bit, C64)
Freaky Factory (Atari 8-bit)
Laser Hawk (Atari 8-bit)
Panic Express (Atari 8-bit, C64)
Rocket Repairman (Atari 8-bit)
Screaming Wings (Amiga, Atari 8-bit, Atari ST)
Space Gunner (Atari 8-bit)
The Domain of the Undead (Atari 8-bit)
War-Copter (Atari 8-bit)

1987
Astro-Droid (Atari 8-bit)
Little Devil (Atari 8-bit)
Nightmares (Atari 8-bit)
Planet Attack (Atari 8-bit)
River Rally (Atari 8-bit)
Robot Knights (Atari 8-bit)
Space Lobsters (Atari 8-bit)

1988
Lombard RAC Rally (Amiga, Atari ST, MS-DOS)
Speed Run (Atari 8-bit)

1989
Hawkquest (Atari 8-bit)
Time Runner (Amiga, Atari ST)

1990
International Soccer Challenge (Amiga, Atari ST, MS-DOS)

1991
Wild Wheels (Amiga, Atari ST, MS-DOS)

1992
Push-Over (Amiga, Atari ST, MS-DOS, SNES)

1993
One Step Beyond (Amiga, Atari ST, MS-DOS)

1985 establishments in England
1993 disestablishments in England
Defunct companies based in Manchester
Defunct video game companies of the United Kingdom
Atari 8-bit family
Video game companies established in 1985
Video game companies disestablished in 1993